Maria Brodacka (22 March 1904 – 19 January 1991) was a Polish painter. Her work was part of the painting event in the art competition at the 1928 Summer Olympics.

References

1904 births
1991 deaths
20th-century Polish painters
Polish women painters
Olympic competitors in art competitions
Artists from Lviv
20th-century Polish women